In mathematics, a trace identity is any equation involving the trace of a matrix.

Properties

Trace identities are invariant under simultaneous conjugation.

Uses

They are frequently used in the invariant theory of  matrices to find the generators and relations of the ring of invariants, and therefore are useful in answering questions similar to that posed by Hilbert's fourteenth problem.

Examples

 The Cayley–Hamilton theorem says that every square matrix satisfies its own characteristic polynomial.
 All square matrices satisfy

See also

References

.

Invariant theory
Linear algebra